is a railway station in Ōmuta, Fukuoka, Japan, operated by the Kyushu Railway Company (JR Kyushu). The station opened on March 12, 2011.

Lines 
Shin-Ōmuta Station is served by the Kyushu Shinkansen.

Platforms

External links

 JR Kyushu - Shin-Ōmuta Station

Railway stations in Fukuoka Prefecture
Railway stations in Japan opened in 2011